Copper zinc antimony sulfide is a semiconductor.

References

Semiconductor materials